The T-Mobile myTouch Q by LG (C800) and the T-Mobile myTouch by LG (E739) are smartphones designed and manufactured by LG Corporation for T-Mobile USA's "myTouch" re-branded series of phones. They run the Android 2.3.6 "Gingerbread" software.  
CyanogenMod supports the myTouch by LG.
The two phones have similar features except for these differences: 
 The "Q" does have a slider-keyboard, the non-Q is a keyboardless design, 
 The "Q" is both thicker and heavier than the non-Q, 
 The screen on the "Q" is smaller than that on the non-Q, 
 The "Q" does not have a front-facing camera, the non-Q does have one with VGA-resolution, 
 The "Q" has a camera feature called "Auto Snap on Smile" that the non-Q apparently does not have.

Features
The myTouch 4G supports Wi-Fi, 3G UMTS and HSPA+, EDGE, and GPRS networks. The myTouch 4G is supported by T-Mobile 4G. The myTouch 4G also supports Wi-Fi Calling.

Hardware
The T-Mobile myTouch 4G runs on a 1GHz Qualcomm Snapdragon processor. It has a 5.0MP camera with auto-focus.  Note that the Q (slider) does not have a front-facing camera, and the non-Q (slate) does not have a flash. The non-Q version sports a front-facing video camera for video chat and video calls, has a wireless card supporting a/b/g/n connections, and a bluetooth 2.1+EDR chip. The myTouch by LG has a lithium-ion battery that is capable of up to XX hours of talk time and XX days of standby time.

Screen
 The myTouch Q by LG has a 3.5" 320x480 HVGA TFT LCD display.
 The myTouch by LG has a 3.8" 480x800 WVGA AMOLED display.

References

External links
 http://mytouch.t-mobile.com/simple-phones
 http://reviews.cnet.com/8301-19736_7-20116708-251/t-mobile-adds-mytouch-mytouch-q-by-lg/

Mobile phones introduced in 2010
Android (operating system) devices
Smartphones
MyTouch